Hinahina is a Hawaiian language common name for several plants, including:

Argyroxiphium sandwicense, endemic to Hawaii
Heliotropium anomalum, native to Hawaii, Guam, Christmas Island, Saipan, Tinian, Wake Island, and New Caledonia